Chartrand is a surname that originates from France. It is a variation of the word "Chartrain", meaning someone from the city of Chartres. Notable people with the name include:

Alaine Chartrand (born 1996), Canadian figure skater
Aurèle Chartrand (1903–1975), Canadian barrister
Brad Chartrand (born 1974), Canadian athlete in ice hockey
Céline Chartrand (born 1962), Canadian javelin thrower at the 1988 Olympics
David Chartrand (born 1960), Canadian politician and activist
Ervin Chartrand, Canadian Ojibway/Métis film director, writer and producer
Gary Chartrand (born 1936), US mathematics professor
Gilbert Chartrand (born 1954), Canadian politician
Isabelle Chartrand (born 1978), Canadian athlete in ice hockey
Joseph Chartrand (1870–1933), US bishop
Judy Chartrand (born 1959), Canadian artist and political activist
Lina Chartrand (1948-1994), Canadian writer
Martine Chartrand (born 1962), Haitian-Canadian filmmaker, visual artist and teacher
Michel Chartrand (1916–2010), Canadian politician
Miranda Chartrand (born 1990), Canadian singer
Philippe Chartrand (born 1963), Canadian gymnast at the 1984 and 1988 Olympics
Simonne Monet-Chartrand (1919–1993), Canadian activist
Tanya Chartrand, American social psychologist
Victor-Stanislas Chartrand (1887–1966), Canadian politician

Surnames of French origin